Noll is a surname, and may refer to:

 John F. Noll (1875–1956), American Catholic bishop
 Lou B. ("Bink") Noll (1927–1986), American poet
 Chuck Noll (1932–2014), American football player and coach
 Kip Noll (1958–2001), American pornographic actor
 Walter Noll (1925–2017), German-American mathematician
 Greg Noll (1937–2021), surfer
 Ingrid Noll (born 1935), German thriller writer
 A. Michael Noll (born 1939), American professor in engineering and telecommunications
 Roger Noll (born 1940), American economist
 João Gilberto Noll (born 1946), Brazilian writer 
 Mark Noll (born 1946), American history professor and evangelical author 
 Michaela Noll (born 1959), German lawyer and politician
 Richard Noll (born 1959), American author and clinical psychologist
 Landon Curt Noll (born 1960), American mathematician and politician 
 Shannon Noll (born 1975), Australian singer-songwriter
 K. L. Noll, American biblical scholar and historian

See also
 Knoll (surname)
 Noel (surname)
 Nowell (surname)
 Knowle (disambiguation), includes list of people with surname Knowle

Surnames from given names
Surnames from nicknames